"The Six Ungraspables" is the fifth episode of the first season of the FX anthology series Fargo. The episode aired on May 13, 2014 in the United States on FX. It was written by series creator and showrunner Noah Hawley and directed by Colin Bucksey. The title refers to the Zen Buddhist kōan known as The Six Ungraspables.

In the episode, Lester Nygaard (Martin Freeman), trapped in a prison cell with the hitmen Mr. Wrench (Russell Harvard) and Mr. Numbers (Adam Goldberg) after the events of the previous episode, finally reveals that the man the duo is after is Lorne Malvo (Billy Bob Thornton). Meanwhile, Malvo, while continuing his scheme of blackmailing Stavros Milos (Oliver Platt), might be looking for revenge after Officer Gus Grimly (Colin Hanks) arrested him in the previous episode.

"The Six Ungraspables" received critical acclaim, and was seen by 1.60 million viewers.

Plot
The episode starts with a flashback on how Lester Nygaard obtained the gun which eventually was used by Lorne Malvo to kill Vern Thurman during Lester's arrest at his own home.

While in the present in jail, Mr. Wrench and Mr. Numbers obtain Malvo's name from Lester. They are released but Lester, whose hand has become severely infected after being hit by one of the shot gun pellets that Malvo fired at Thurman, is taken to the hospital. Molly Solverson rides in the ambulance and tries to get more information from Lester, though he is slightly delirious. She presents her evidence to Chief Oswalt, who is beginning to realize that all the recent events are related.

With Stavros close to paying the blackmail demand, Malvo locks Chumph in his kitchen pantry overnight to prevent him from ruining the scheme. Malvo takes Stavros home and leaves. He spots Grimly parked by the road near the house and later follows Grimly to his home, but is confronted in his car by Grimly's neighbor.  He threatens the neighbor before driving away.

Reception

Ratings
The episode was first aired in the US on FX on May 13, 2014 and obtained 1.60 million viewers. The show was aired in the UK on Channel 4 on May 18, 2014 and was seen by 1.0 million viewers.

Critical reception
The episode received critical acclaim. It currently holds a perfect 100% rating on Rotten Tomatoes.

The A.V. Club writers Emily VanDerWerff and Zack Handlen gave the episode an A rating, saying "(...) this episode was immensely enjoyable, although some of that enjoyment was tempered for me by a very deep concern that Gus was about to get shot," followed by "It’s a good sign when a show can make you worry this much about someone so quickly."

Another positive review came from IGN's Roth Cornet, who gave the episode an "amazing" rating of 9.3/10 and said "Midway through Fargo’s 10-episode run, the series at large is revealing itself to be an elaborate and gorgeously crafted grim parable in its own right."

References

External links 
 

2014 American television episodes
Fargo (TV series) episodes
Television episodes written by Noah Hawley